Yuri Tsolakovich Oganessian (born 14 April 1933) is a Russian-Armenian nuclear physicist who is best known as a researcher of superheavy chemical elements. He participated with the discovery of several elements of the periodic table. He succeeded Georgy Flyorov as director of the Flerov Laboratory of Nuclear Reactions at the Joint Institute for Nuclear Research in 1989 and is now its scientific director. The heaviest element known of the periodic table, oganesson, is named after him, only the second time that an element was named after a living person (the other being seaborgium).

Personal life
Yuri Tsolakovich Oganessian was born in Rostov-on-Don, Russian SFSR, USSR on 14 April 1933 to Armenian parents. His father was from Iğdır (now in Turkey), while his mother was from Armavir in Russia's Krasnodar Krai. Oganessian spent his childhood in Yerevan, the capital of Soviet Armenia, where his family relocated in 1939. His father, Tsolak, a thermal engineer, was invited to work on the synthetic rubber plant in Yerevan. After the Eastern Front of World War II commenced, his family decided to not return to Rostov since it was occupied by Germans. Yuri attended and finished school in Yerevan. He initially wanted to become a painter.

Oganessian was married to Irina Levonovna (1932–2010), a violinist and a music teacher in Dubna, with whom he had two daughters. As of 2017, his daughters resided in the USA.

Oganessian speaks Russian, Armenian, and English.

Career

Oganessian relocated to Russia, where he graduated from the Moscow Engineering Physics Institute (MEPhI) in 1956. He thereafter sought to join the Kurchatov Institute of Atomic Energy in Moscow, but as there were no vacancies left in Gersh Budker's team, he was instead recruited by Georgy Flyorov and began working at the Joint Institute for Nuclear Research (JINR) in Dubna, near Moscow.

He became director of the Flerov Laboratory of Nuclear Reactions at JINR in 1989, after Flerov retired, and had the job until 1996, when he was named the scientific director of the Flerov laboratory.

Discovery of superheavy chemical elements
During the 1970s, Oganessian invented the "cold fusion" method (unrelated to the unproven energy-producing process cold fusion), a technique to produce transactinide elements (superheavy elements). It was crucial for the discoveries of elements from 106 to 113. From the mid-1970s to the mid-1990s, the partnership of JINR, directed by Oganessian, and the GSI Helmholtz Centre for Heavy Ion Research in Germany, resulted in the discovery of six chemical elements (107 to 112): bohrium, meitnerium, hassium, darmstadtium, roentgenium, and copernicium.

His newer technique, termed "hot fusion" (also unrelated to nuclear fusion as an energy process), helped to discover elements 113 to 118, completing the seventh row of the periodic table. The technique involved bombarding calcium into targets containing heavier radioactive elements that are rich in neutrons at a cyclotron. The elements discovered using this method are nihonium (2003; also discovered by RIKEN in Japan using cold fusion), flerovium (1999), moscovium (2003), livermorium (2000), tennessine (2009), and oganesson (2002).

Recognition

American chemist Sherry Yennello has called him the "grandfather of superheavy elements". Oganessian is the author of three discoveries, a monograph, 11 inventions, and more than 300 scientific papers.

Oganesson
During early 2016, science writers and bloggers speculated that one of the superheavy elements would be named oganessium or oganesson. The International Union of Pure and Applied Chemistry (IUPAC) announced in November 2016 that element 118 would be named oganesson to honor Oganessian. It was first observed in 2002 at JINR, by a joint team of Russian and American scientists. Directed by Oganessian, the team included American scientists of the Lawrence Livermore National Laboratory, California. Prior to this announcement, a dozen elements had been named after people, but of those, only seaborgium was likewise named while its namesake (Glenn T. Seaborg) was alive. As Seaborg died in 1999, Oganessian is the only currently living namesake of an element.

Honors and awards
In 1990, he was elected Corresponding Member of the Soviet Academy of Sciences and in 2003 a Full Member (Academician) of the Russian Academy of Sciences.

Oganessian has honorary degrees from Goethe University Frankfurt (2002), University of Messina (2009), and Yerevan State University. In 2019, he was elected as an Honorary Fellow of St Catharine's College, Cambridge.

State awards
USSR State Prize (1975)
Order "For Merit to the Fatherland" 3rd class (2003)
Russian Federation National Award (2010)
Order of Honor of the Republic of Armenia (2016)
Order of St. Mesrop Mashtots (Armenia, 2019)

Professional awards
Kurchatov Medal (1989)
Lise Meitner Prize of the European Physical Society (2000)
Lomonosov Gold Medal (2018) "for fundamental research in the fields of interaction of complex nuclei and experimental evidence of existence of an 'island of stability' for superheavy elements"
Demidov Prize (2019)
UNESCO-Russia Mendeleev International Prize in the Basic Sciences (2021)

Recognition in Armenia
Oganessian was granted Armenian citizenship in July 2018 by Premier Nikol Pashinyan. Oganessian is a member of the Board of Trustees of the Foundation for Armenian Science and Technology (FAST). He is also the chairman of the international scientific board of the Alikhanian National Science Laboratory (Yerevan Physics Institute). In 2017 HayPost issued a postage stamp dedicated to Oganessian. In 2022 the Central Bank of Armenia issued a silver commemorative coin dedicated to Oganessian and the element oganesson (Og). In April 2022 he was named honorary professor of Yerevan State University.

Selected publications

Notes

References

External links 
 

1933 births
Corresponding Members of the USSR Academy of Sciences
Full Members of the Russian Academy of Sciences
Living people
Scientists from Rostov-on-Don
Russian people of Armenian descent
Armenian scientists
Russian nuclear physicists
Armenian nuclear physicists
Soviet nuclear physicists
20th-century Russian physicists
21st-century Russian physicists
Moscow Engineering Physics Institute alumni
Discoverers of chemical elements
Recipients of the Lomonosov Gold Medal
Fellows of the American Physical Society
Foreign members of the Serbian Academy of Sciences and Arts